TV3 is the largest commercial television channel in the Baltic States established by Viasat.

TV channels

History
In 2017, TV3 Group (then known as All Media Baltics) was established, belonging to the telecommunications company Bitė Group, managed by Providence Equity, a US private equity fund.

In 2017, Bitė Group acquired all the shares of the Estonian company Viasat, TV3 Group, which manages the television channels TV3, TV6, TV8, as well also the radio station Power Hit Radio, and other brands in the Baltic countries from the Swedish media concern Modern Times Group (MTG). MTG Baltics branch became "All Media Baltics".

In December 2019, in December, All Media Baltics changed its name to TV3 Group and the managed internet television and movie, series rental platform "Go3". The brand image of "TV3" television and other groups was also updated. Home3 (formerly Viasat) became the platform for satellite television services. In 2020, Latvijas Neatkarīgā Televīzija channel was discontinued in Latvia. It was replaced by TV3 Life and TV3 Mini channels.

References

External links
 
 TV3 Lietuva (Lithuania)
 TV3 Latvija (Latvia)
 TV3 Eesti (Estonia)

Eastern Bloc mass media
Mass media in Lithuania
Mass media in Latvia
Mass media in Estonia